Susan Angela Costin (9 September 1944 – 5 April 1971) was an Australian professional swimmer and actress who represented Australia during the 1962 British Empire and Commonwealth Games in the women's backstroke events, and then had a short acting career, most notably in the TV series Riptide. In later life, she suffered with depression and took her own life. She was studying arts at the University of New South Wales at the time of her death.

Life and career
Costin was born Susan Angela Costin on 9 September 1944 at King George V Hospital to Angela Mann (later Angela Costin), a rowing master and her husband Wes, who both later also had another child, Prudence. In 1954, the family moved to Baulkham Hills, where Sue and her sister began swimming at Granville pool and became competitive members of the Parramatta City Amateur Swimming Club.

Swimming
In 1959, Costin won the western Sydney swimming title and represented New South Wales in 1960 during the Australian Swimming Championships. She also won the Gladstone skiff rowing event, which she was using a form of training for the upcoming 1962 British Empire and Commonwealth Games and was by then described as "an outstanding backstroke swimmer". In January 1962, Costin lowered the Australian  record in backstroke for the second time within three days, with a time of 1 minute 12.5 seconds, just 1.55 seconds short of the record held by British swimmer Nancy Stewart. She was described that year by Australian freestyle swimmer Ilsa Konrads as being "undoubtedly Australia's best stylist in backstroke".

In October 1962, when Costin was a member of the Australian swimming squad training for the 1962 British Empire and Commonwealth Games in Perth, she set two new Australian records in the women's  and  backstroke. At this time, she was being coached by Bruce McDonald. Earlier that month, she had come within one second of the world 220 yard record. Two years later, she failed to quality for the 1964 Summer Olympics in Tokyo and subsequently decided to retire from competitive swimming. As of 2005, her  backstroke record set in 1958/59 at the Parramatta City Swimming Club for girls aged 16 years remained unbeaten.

Acting
She starred in the short-lived 1969 ATN Channel 7 series Riptide and starred in an episode of Barrier Reef, with her swimming and backstroke experience being primary reasons for her casting.

Death
In the period leading up to her death, Costin's uncle Athol Patterson, who had not seen her for 12 months before her death, noted she had been "highly strung" and was suffering with depression, although she was on good terms with her family and was living with her mother. She had been receiving psychiatric treatment and was a patient in the Caritas Hospital in Darlinghurst from 8 March to 2 April 1971.

On 5 April 1971, she was found dead in a motel room in Paddington, New South Wales. Two small capsules were found with her, and the coroner ruled her death was due to taking poison. At the time of her death, she was studying arts at the University of New South Wales. She was believed to have died some time around 3 April. Her funeral was held on 8 April 1971.

See also
 Sue Costin on the Internet Movie Database

References

1944 births
1971 deaths
Actresses from Sydney
Australian female swimmers
Australian television actresses
Suicides in New South Wales
1971 suicides
Suicides by poison